Three Mysteries is a collection of mystery stories by author Donald Wandrei. It was released in 2000 by F & B Mystery in an edition of 125 copies of which 100 were released in a slipcase with the limited edition of Wandrei's Frost.

Contents
 "The Siege of Mr. Martin"
 "Dramatic Touch"
 "Game of Legs"

References

2000 short story collections
Mystery short story collections
Fedogan & Bremer books